1300 series may refer to:

Japanese train types
 Hankyu 1300 series (1957) EMU operated by Hankyu Corporation between 1957 and 1987
 Hankyu 1300 series EMU operated by Hankyu Corporation since 2014